Loghman Khaledi (born 23 July 1978 in Kermanshah) is an Iranian film director, scriptwriter, and film editor.

In 2001, he made his first film "Focus".

Filmography

Awards
First Prize of FIDMarseille Festival(2011)

External links
 Nessa Sheherazad Media International
 Profile at LinkedIn

1978 births
Living people
Iranian film directors
Iranian screenwriters
Iranian film editors
People from Kermanshah